The Name of the Rose is the first EP released by the melodic hard rock band Ten. The compact disc was officially released only in Asian markets.

Track listing
All songs written by Gary Hughes.
 "The Name of the Rose" (Edit version) – 6:15
 "When Only Love Can Ease the Pain" – 5:59
 "After the Love Has Gone" (Live version)– 5:21
 "Can't Slow Down" (Live version) – 6:18
 "The Name of the Rose" (Karaoke version) – 8:43
 "Message From Gary Hughes" (Spoken word) – 2:11

All tracks were previously unreleased.
Tracks 1 and 5, original version on the album The Name of the Rose.
Tracks 3 and 4, recorded live on May 5th, 1996 in Wigan, England by Royston Hollyer and Audu Obaje.

Personnel
Gary Hughes – vocals
Vinny Burns – Lead guitars
John Halliwell – Rhythm guitars
Ged Rylands – keyboards
Shelly – bass guitar
Greg Morgan – drums

Production
Producer – Gary Hughes and Mike Stone (Tracks 1 and 5)
Producer – Gary Hughes (Tracks 2, 3 and 4)
Mixing – Mike Stone (Tracks 1, 2 and 5)
Mixing – Ray Brophy (Tracks 3 and 4)

External links
Heavy Harmonies page

Ten (band) albums
1996 EPs
Albums produced by Gary Hughes
Albums produced by Mike Stone (record producer)